Nick Finck is a UX & design professional, advisor, mentor, coach, speaker and is the founder of Craft & Rigor, a design operations consultancy, in Seattle, Washington. He is known as the co-creator of progressive enhancement. Nick was a co-creator if the Web Standards Project (WaSP) Education Task Force curriculum (Interact/WaSP) which was later merged into the W3C’s learning material.

He was the founder and publisher of Digital Web Magazine, a publication for web professionals, in 1996 until it ceased publication in 2009.

Nick was a founding member of the Web Standards Project (WaSP), and a founding member of the Information Architecture Institute (IAI). He was also the Pacific Northwest Ambassador for UXnet prior to it being disbanded in 2010.

Professional background
In 1994 Nick established his first web consultancy, Designs by Nick Finck, based out of Portland, Oregon. Since then he has headed up design a research at many agencies and tech product & service companies.

Nick was the head of design & research at AWS (2013-2015), product design manager for Platform at Facebook (2015-2017), he was the head of design & research at Ubermind (2011-2013) which was acquired by Deloitte in 2012, the head of design & research and founder of the Seattle office of projekt202 (2013), and co-founder of Blue Flavor (2005-2011) that was acquired by Blink in 2010.

See also
 NickFinck.com (personal website)
 Progressive enhancement (co-creator)
 Information architecture
 liquid web design

Interviews
 Aurelius Podcast - Episode 46 – Leadership, career progression, hiring & job hunting in UX with Nick Finck
 Making UX Work with Joe Natoli - Episode 17, Nick Finck - removing fear, reaching out and remaining hungry
 User Defenders podcast - Episode 036 - No Designer Left Behind with Nick Finck
 iStockPhoto
 South by Southwest Tech Report

References

Information architects
Web developers
Computer programmers
Living people
1975 births